Ángel Masié Ntutumu (1930 - 4 October 2020) was an Equatorial Guinean politician.

Biography

The following year he was appointed Minister of National Security, Deputy Minister of Health, and Presidential Secretary. He is considered to have been responsible for some repressive incidents on Bioko Island in 1974. In 1976 he fell into disgrace and went into exile in Spain.

In 1979, he supported the 1979 coup d'état led by Teodoro Obiang from exile, and returned to the country.

He was a member of the Chamber of Deputies for the Democratic Party of Equatorial Guinea (Partido Democrático de Guinea Ecuatorial; PDGE). Later he went over to the opposition and joined the Popular Union party, forming part of its National Political Council. His work resulted in him being arrested in 1991 and 1993.

In 2010 he rejoined the PDGE.

His son is the politician Ángel Masié Mibuy, a current government minister.

References

1930 births
Democratic Party of Equatorial Guinea politicians
Equatoguinean exiles
Exiled politicians
Government ministers of Equatorial Guinea
2020 deaths
Members of the Chamber of Deputies (Equatorial Guinea)